"Spring Love" is a song by South Korea-based American singer Eric Nam and South Korean singer Wendy, a member of the South Korean girl group Red Velvet. It was released digitally by SM Entertainment on March 4, 2016, as the fourth single of the first season of the label's digital music project, SM Station. Composed by Kevin Writer and Douglas James with lyrics by Hwang Hyun (MonoTree) and Agnes Shin, the song is an acoustic ballad about friends developing romantic feelings for one another as the season gets warmer in the beginning of spring.

The single was a commercial success upon its release. It was both Nam and Wendy's first top-ten entry on the Gaon Digital Chart, peaking at number seven on its second week. It eventually became the sixty-first best-selling song in South Korea in 2016, having achieved over 820,131 downloads. The song was also nominated for Best Collaboration at the 18th Mnet Asian Music Awards, but lost to Wendy's fellow labelmate Baekhyun with his collaboration single "Dream".

Background and composition
In January 2016, S.M. Entertainment, one of the largest entertainment companies in South Korea, launched a digital music project called SM Station which would give their artists a platform to release music, with the intention of releasing a new single by an S.M. Entertainment artist each week for an entire year. Girls' Generation member Taeyeon started the digital project by releasing the single "Rain" on February 3, 2016. After two more releases, the company announced that Red Velvet member Wendy and non-S.M. Entertainment artist Eric Nam would be the fourth to participate in the project. On March 4, the single was released along with an accompanying music video.
"Spring Love" was produced by Kevin Writer and Douglas James, while its lyrics were penned by Hwang Hyun and Agnes Shin. The song is described as a mid-tempo ballad with an acoustic arrangement. Lyrically, it is a youthful song about friends falling in love as the weather grows warmer.

Promotion and reception
A music video of the song directed by Shim Hyung-jun was premiered on the official YouTube channel of S.M. Entertainment in conjunction with the single's release. In it, Eric Nam and Wendy are depicted as a couple who enjoy their day together at an amusement park, riding various attractions.

In December 2016, Nam and Wendy sang the song on Yang&Nam Show, a show hosted by Nam, in which Red Velvet appeared as guests in its 4th episode. On March 30, 2017, they performed it live for the first time at KCON Mexico.

"Spring Love" was a commercial success in South Korea. It debuted at number ten on the Gaon Digital Chart, eventually peaked at number seven one week later, thus became both Nam and Wendy's first top-ten entry on the chart. Its accompanying music video was the ninth most watched K-pop video in America and tenth worldwide for the month of March. The single was the ninth best-selling song on the March issue of the Gaon Monthly Digital Chart, and went on to become the sixty-first best-selling song in South Korea in 2016, with a total sales of over 820,131 downloads.

Billboard included it in its '7 Essential K-Pop Songs' for spring in 2016 and in November, the song was nominated at the 18th Mnet Asian Music Awards for Best Collaboration.

Track listing
Digital download / streaming

 "Spring Love"3:18
 "Spring Love" (Instrumental)3:18

Credits and personnel
Credits adapted from Melon.

Studio

 Recorded and edited at In Grid Studio
 Edited at MonoTree Studio
 Mixed at SM Blue Ocean Studio
 Mastered at Sterling Sound

Personnel

Eric Namvocals
Wendyvocals, background vocals
Hwang Hyunsongwriting, arrangement, piano
Shin Agnessongwriting
Kevin Writercomposition, arrangement
Douglas Jamescomposition, arrangement
Lee Ju-hyungvocal directing, background vocals, Pro Tools operation, digital editing
Kim Byung-seokbass
Jeong Su-wanguitar
Gil Eun-kyungkeyboard
Jeong Eun-kyungrecording, digital editing
Woo Min-jungrecording
Kim Chul-soonmixing
Tom Coynemastering

Charts

Weekly charts

Monthly charts

Year-end charts

Release history

References

2016 singles
SM Entertainment singles
Korean-language songs
2016 songs
Wendy (singer) songs